The Consorcio Regional de Transportes de Madrid (CRTM; literally: Regional Consortium of Transportation for Madrid) is an autonomous body created by Spanish law 5/1985 which is tasked with coordinating the public transport operations across multiple providers in the Community of Madrid. It harmonizes fares for commuter rail, rapid transit, light rail and bus transport services provided by entities such as Renfe Cercanías, Metro de Madrid S.A. or the Empresa Municipal de Transportes de Madrid (EMT).

Its executive board is presided by the regional minister for Transportation. The vicepresident is a member of the Municipal Council of Madrid. The rest of board members are 6 more representatives of the regional government, 2 more representatives of the Madrid municipal council, 3 representatives of other municipal councils, 2 representatives of the State administration, 2 syndical representatives, 2 representatives of corporate associations and 1 representative of consumer associations.

Intercity buses 
Intercity transport, i.e. journeys that go between different municipalities in the Madrid region, are operated by the CRTM. The company operates three separate types of lines; (i) daytime lines, (ii) daytime lines with added night service, and (iii) dedicated night lines. The inter-urban night buses, commonly known as Green Owls, travel further afield than the regular N1-N28 owl buses within Madrid urban core (which are operated by EMT), and connect Madrid with the smaller cities of the periphery. As of June 2022 there are 40 such routes. Green Owl buses are identified by the letter N followed by three numbers (e.g. N101). It has been noted that real-time indicators at bus stops usually display only the number of a route, and not the "N" at the beginning, which can be a cause of confusion for visitors, as the route 101 can have a completely different destination to the route N101 (for example).

References 

Transport in the Community of Madrid
Public transport authorities of Spain